Cerithiopsis  pulvis is a species of sea snail, a gastropod in the family Cerithiopsidae, which is known from European waters, including the Mediterranean Sea. It was described by Issel, in 1869.

Distribution
This species occurs in the North Atlantic Ocean; as an alien species in the Mediterranean Sea (off Lebanon)

References

 Gofas, S.; Le Renard, J.; Bouchet, P. (2001). Mollusca, in: Costello, M.J. et al. (Ed.) (2001). European register of marine species: a check-list of the marine species in Europe and a bibliography of guides to their identification. Collection Patrimoines Naturels, 50: pp. 180–213 
 Streftaris, N.; Zenetos, A.; Papathanassiou, E. (2005). Globalisation in marine ecosystems: the story of non-indigenous marine species across European seas. Oceanogr. Mar. Biol. Annu. Rev. 43: 419-453
 Cecalupo A. & Robba E. (2010) The identity of Murex tubercularis Montagu, 1803 and description of one new genus and two new species of the Cerithiopsidae (Gastropoda: Triphoroidea). Bollettino Malacologico 46: 45-64.

pulvis
Gastropods described in 1869